There have been numerous Federal Bureau of Investigation (FBI) whistleblowers who have spoken out about misconduct and wrongdoing in the FBI. Below is a list of whistleblowers who have come forward and made public whistleblower disclosures about the FBI.

List

See also
List of FBI controversies
List of whistleblowers
Whistleblower protection in the United States

References

American whistleblowers
Federal Bureau of Investigation personnel